The original meaning of the word shuttle is the device used in weaving to carry the weft. By reference to the continual to-and-fro motion associated with that, the term was then applied in transportation and then in other spheres. Thus the word may now also refer to:

Transport

Air transport
 Air shuttle, a type of flight which quickly connects nearby destinations
 Delta Shuttle, the brand name for Delta Air Lines' air shuttle service
 Rossi Shuttle Quik, an Italian ultralight trike design 
 Shuttle America, a regional airline based in Indianapolis, Indiana
 Shuttle by United, a regional airline operated as a subsidiary of United Airlines
 Shuttle Carrier Aircraft, modified Boeing 747 airliners used to transport Space Shuttle orbiters
 US Airways Shuttle, the brand name for an hourly service offered by US Airways
 The call sign for domestic (UK internal) British Airways flights - international flights use Speedbird

Land transport

Automotive brands
 Fit Shuttle, the station wagon version of Honda Fit
Honda Shuttle, the first generation Honda Odyssey

Mass transit
Transport systems operating at frequent intervals on a short, (mostly) non-stop route between two places
Shuttle bus service
Shuttle train service
Car shuttle train
 Eurotunnel Shuttle, the car-carrying trains used in the Channel Tunnel
 S (New York City Subway service), three shuttle train routes
42nd Street Shuttle, shuttle train between Grand Central and Port Authority
Franklin Avenue Shuttle
Rockaway Park Shuttle
 Shuttle (Amtrak)
 Shuttle van, a New Zealand term for shared taxis

Spacecraft
 Buran-class shuttle, the vehicle for the Soviet Buran programme.
 Space Shuttle, the vehicle for the NASA Space Shuttle program from 1981 to 2011.
 Space Shuttle orbiter, a space plane, the crewed part of the Space Shuttle.
 Shuttle (spacecraft type), a smaller spacecraft used for ship-to-ship and ship-to-ground transport in theory and science fiction

Places
 River Shuttle, a river of southeast London in England

Arts, entertainment, and media 
 Shuttle (film), a 2008 thriller film
 Shuttle (video game), a video game produced by Virgin
 Shuttling (patience term), a method of play in patience and solitaire games

Sciences and technology 
 Molecular shuttles, a molecule capable of nano scale transportation
 Multi-project wafer service (|MPW) shuttle, an integrated circuit production run for multi-chip or multi-project wafers
 Shuttle bombing, a World War II strategic bombing tactic
 Shuttle vector, vector that shuttles between species, biochemistry, genetics

Sports
 20-yard shuttle, test performed by American football players
 Shuttlecock or birdie, the object batted back and forth in badminton

Other uses
 Shuttle, school bullying in South Korea
 Shuttle Inc., a manufacturer of small form-factor computers
 Shuttle trading, a form of goods distribution
 , a United States Navy patrol vessel in commission from 1918 to 1919
 Shuttle used by a weavers at textile mill or on a loom.

See also
 The Shuttle (disambiguation)